Winter Begonia is a 2020 Chinese television series starring Huang Xiaoming, Yin Zheng, and Charmaine Sheh, based on Shui Ru Tian Er's BL web novel of the same name. It aired exclusively on iQiyi and tells the story of the close relationship between a shrewd businessman and a Peking opera genius right before the World War II. While the original web novel depicted the relationship between the two main men as romantic, the adaptation changed this depiction into a "bromance".

The show has been praised for its story, visuals and tasteful promotion of Chinese traditional culture, particularly Peking opera. iQiyi released a talk show named Wang Peiyu Peking Opera Show alongside the drama, which features Peking opera performer Wang Peiyu as she elaborates about operatic repertoire/traditions found in Winter Begonia and in real life.

The series began airing on August 7 on Beijing TV at 19:30 CST.

Synopsis 
In 1930s Beijing, Shang Xirui (Yin Zheng) is a famous Peking opera dan performer known for his talent and passion for his art. He meets Cheng Fengtai (Huang Xiaoming), a businessman who saves him from an unruly audience during a performance. Cheng becomes interested in Peking opera and the two men become close. Together, they overcome many obstacles including the objection of Fengtai's wife (Charmaine Sheh), and must struggle to preserve their art in the face of the incoming Japanese occupation.

Cast

Main 
Huang Xiaoming as Cheng Fengtai, a businessman
Yin Zheng as Shang Xirui, an opera performer
Charmaine Sheh as Fan Xianger, Fengtai's wife

Supporting 
Tan Jianci as Chen Renxiang
Merxat as Fan Lian
 Tang Zengcao as Cao Guixiu
 Liu Min as Cheng Meixin
Huang Shengyi as Gu Dali
 Li Zefeng as Du Qi
 Chin Shih-chieh as Jiang Rongshou
Du Chun as Yuan Xiaodi
Bai Bing as Jiang Mengping
 Li Chunai as Xiao Lai
 Wang Xichao as Jiang Dengbao
 Ma Su as Yue Liang
 Anna Fang as Shi Jiu
 Tang Jingmei as Ceng Aiyu
 Zhang Yixi as Cha Chaer
 Huang Xingyou as Zhou Xiangyun
 Cheng Feng as Xue Qianshan
 Chi Shuai as Chang Zhixin
 Wang Maolei as Shang Juzhen
 Li Yixiao as Cheng Mu
 Hei Zi as Cao Siling
 Michelle Yim as Lao Fujin
 Gao Yu'er as Yu Qing
 Hou Yansong as Liu Hanyu
 Zhang Gongshi as Wang Qi
 Lei Han as Ning Jiulang
 Wen Haibo as Chairman Zheng
 Liu Boxiao as Lao Ge
 Sun Di as Si Xi'er
 Zhang Tianyun as Chun Xing
 Shen Baoping as Hou Yukui

Production

Shooting 
The previous 55 episodes were shortened to 49 in June 2018. Shooting began on December 13, 2018 at Hengdian World Studios. Principal photography ended on April 29, 2019, and entered post-production.

Peking opera depictions 

To accurately depict the traditions of Peking opera on the small screen, production brought in experts of the craft to train the actors. The crew also invited 90-year old Peking Opera performing artist Bi Guyun as a drama consultant. Yin Zheng also received one month of closed training from the master. The crew also invited practitioners of specific styles of Peking opera, such as Hui opera, to direct the plays that are performed in the drama. As there were many scenes featuring Kunqu opera, it is reported that two Kunqu opera directors were needed.

Sets and costumes 
The two theaters featured were one-on-one reconstructions of Beijing-Guangzhou Hall and Hu Guang Hall. The Cheng Fu Pavilion and Shui Yun Tower were also completely built by production, necessitating around 20,000 square meters.

More than 200 sets of costumes were used in the drama, with more than 100 of them customized by the production team. The Peking make-up and hairstyle on actors were also supervised by professional opera teachers. Art design was headed by Luan Hexin, while clothing design was headed by Song Xiaotao and Li Anqi. Li Xiaoli was in charge of makeup.

Original soundtrack 

Winter Begonia Original Soundtrack was compiled and released on March 19, 2020 as an extended play.

Reception 
Winter Begonia has been well received by viewers and critics. Its first 12 episodes debuted with a 7.3 out of 10 on Douban. By its conclusion, the show subsequently rose to an 8.1, aggregated by over 100,000 user reviews. The series reportedly went viral on Sina Weibo, in which the show's hashtag received 480 million clicks.

Beijing Youth Entertainment praised Huang Xiaoming and Yin Zheng's acting as well as the drama's depiction of Peking opera, highlighting it as an example of the potential for film and television to help spread traditional Chinese art and culture. People's Entertainment praised the show's visuals and the interesting depiction of female characters and their relationships.

Award and nominations

References

External links 

 Winter Begonia on Weibo
 Winter Begonia on Douban

Chinese period television series
Chinese romance television series
2020 Chinese television series debuts
2020 Chinese television series endings
Television series by Huanyu Film
Mandarin-language television shows
Chinese web series
IQIYI original programming
Television shows based on Chinese novels
Fiction about Chinese opera